1999 Hirayama is a dark background asteroid from the outer region of the asteroid belt, approximately  in diameter. It was discovered on 27 February 1973, by Czech astronomer Luboš Kohoutek at the Hamburger Bergedorf Observatory in Germany, and later named after Japanese astronomer Kiyotsugu Hirayama.

Orbit and classification 

Hirayama orbits the Sun in the outer main-belt at a distance of 2.8–3.5 AU once every 5 years and 6 months (2,010 days). Its orbit has an eccentricity of 0.12 and an inclination of 13° with respect to the ecliptic. The spectrum of Hirayama matches a C-type classification on the Tholen taxonomic scheme, but with a "broad absorption band that can be associated to a process of aqueous alteration". That is, the surface appears to show some form of water modification.

Naming 

This minor planet is named in honour of Japanese astronomer Kiyotsugu Hirayama (1874–1943), best known for his discovery that many asteroid orbits were more similar to one another than chance would allow, leading to the concept of asteroid families, now called Hirayama families. The lunar crater Hirayama is also named in his honour. The official  was published by the Minor Planet Center on 15 October 1977.

Physical characteristics

Rotation period 

A rotational lightcurve of Hirayama was obtained at the Menke Observatory in February 2002. At the same time, photometric observations by astronomers Roberto Crippa and Federico Manzini gave a rotation period of 22.37 hours and a brightness variation of 0.47 magnitude. These results supersede an observation from January 2005, by Hiromi and Hiroko Hamanowa at their Hamanowa Astronomical Observatory, Japan, that gave a shorter period of 13.59 hours with an amplitude of 0.57 magnitude.().

Diameter and albedo 

According to the surveys carried out by the Infrared Astronomical Satellite IRAS, the Japanese Akari satellite, and NASA's Wide-field Infrared Survey Explorer with its subsequent NEOWISE mission, the asteroid measures between 34.0 and 38.3 kilometers in diameter and its surface has an albedo between 0.053 and 0.088. The Collaborative Asteroid Lightcurve Link derives an albedo of 0.062 and a diameter of 33.8 kilometers with an absolute magnitude of 11.0.

Notes

References

External links 
 Lightcurve Database Query (LCDB), at www.minorplanet.info
 Dictionary of Minor Planet Names, Google books
 Asteroids and comets rotation curves, CdR – Geneva Observatory, Raoul Behrend
 Discovery Circumstances: Numbered Minor Planets (1)-(5000)  – Minor Planet Center
 
 

001999
Discoveries by Luboš Kohoutek
Named minor planets
19730227